Harold Joseph Jeghers (September 26, 1904 – September 21, 1990) was an American internist, best known for his description of Peutz–Jeghers syndrome, a disorder of gastrointestinal polyps and hyperpigmentation of the mouth and lips.

Life and scientific career
Jeghers was born in Jersey City, New Jersey, in 1904. In 1928, he graduated from Rensselaer Polytechnic Institute with a Bachelor of Science in Biology. He graduated from medical school at Western Reserve University in 1932. He worked as a consultant at Boston City Hospital before being appointed chairman of the Medicine Department at Georgetown University in 1946. In 1956,  he become a professor at Seton Hall College. In 1966, he became a professor of Medicine at Tufts University School of Medicine. He retired in 1974.

He is best known for the description of Peutz–Jeghers syndrome in 1949, a syndrome of polyps in the gastrointestinal tract associated with hyperpigmentation of the lips and oral mucosa. The syndrome was previously described by Jan Peutz in 1921.

References

1904 births
1990 deaths
Case Western Reserve University alumni
Georgetown University Medical Center faculty
Seton Hall University faculty
Tufts University School of Medicine faculty
American internists
Rensselaer Polytechnic Institute alumni